Iliyan Rumenov Iliev (born 6 November 1988)  is a Bulgarian footballer who plays as a midfielder.

Career
He made his debut in Marek Dupnitsa on 8 August in the team's 0–0 draw with Etar Veliko Tarnovo. On 22 August Iliev scored his first goal against Kom-Minyor. In the 2009–10 campaign he appeared in 28 matches and scored one goal.

On 20 January 2011, Iliev joined Minyor Pernik on a three-year contract, taking squad number 15.

On 4 January 2017, Iliev returned to Minyor Pernik.

References

External links
 

Bulgarian footballers
1988 births
Living people
First Professional Football League (Bulgaria) players
PFC Marek Dupnitsa players
PFC Minyor Pernik players
FC Montana players
FC Septemvri Simitli players
FC Botev Vratsa players
Association football midfielders